Soul Control is a German musical duo consisting of Thomas "Tom" Quella (born 1970 in Berlin) and Leonard "Leo" Buck (born 1979 in Sierra Leone).  They are best known for their 2004 single "Chocolate (Choco Choco)".

History 
They gained fame through their 2004 single "Chocolate (Choco Choco)", which was placed in the top five of the charts in Germany, Austria and Switzerland and was released in over 40 countries. Tom and Leo met at a concert by Leo's band Moddeling Throu in 1999. Together with Bruce Hammond produced both the song Chocolate and the following album Here We Go. In 2004 they were Part of the Toggo tour. 

In 2007 they worked with Gerald Anderson for the song "Don't Play with Your Noodle (La La La)". This was also released on the album Gerald's Noodle Dance . A similar thing happened with the song "So Sexy". This time they worked together with Marian Rivera.

Discography

Albums

Studio albums

EPs

Singles

Other songs

Music videos 
 Chocolate (Choco Choco)
 Baila Loco
 Deutschland ist Cool
 Chirpy Chirpy Cheep Cheep
 Don't Play with your Noodle
 So Sexy
 Now that you've gone
 Butterfly

Other 
 I Am a Butterfly (single song)
 A video game was developed for Baila Loco, it is on the Maxi CD.
 In Japan an anime for the single "Chocolate" aired in 2006.
 The Japanese version of "Chocolate" was the main theme of the FujiTV production "Ponkikki"

Awards 

 ADTV Award 2004 for the „Choco Choco Dance“
 Entry in the Guinness Book of Records. On 4 July 2006, 200,000 people danced in Berlin to the song "CHIRPY CHIRPY CHEEP CHEEP"
 World record 2004: 1987 people danced to Chocolate at the same time
 2017 Another attempt was made in Poland to set a world record with Chocolate.
 Dutch Nickelodeon Kids Choice Award 2004

See also 
Music of Germany

References

External links 
 Soul Control on Myspace
 Website on the Webarchive
 Soul Control on AllMusic
 Soul Control on Discogs

German musical duos
German pop music groups
Male musical duos
2004 establishments in Germany